McColloch's Leap was a feat performed during a September 1777 attack by Native Americans on Fort Henry, site of present-day Wheeling, West Virginia, during the American Revolutionary War.

On September 1, 1777, during a Native American siege on the fort, Major Samuel McColloch arrived at the fort with 40 mounted men from Short Creek. To allow entrance the gates were opened for the men. Major McColloch lingered behind to guide and protect the men. The Indians attacked, and all of the men except McColloch made it inside before they were forced to close the gates. McColloch found himself alone and surrounded by Native Americans, and he rode immediately towards the nearby hill in an attempt to escape. McColloch had earned a reputation as a very successful "borderer" (one who protected the frontier borders from the Native Americans) and was well known to both the frontiersmen and the Indians. The Indians eagerly pursued McColloch, and drove him to the summit of the hill.

As he rode along the top of the hill, he encountered another large body of Indians. He now found himself surrounded, with no path of escape. He knew, because of his reputation and history against the Indians, he would be tortured and killed with great cruelty if he were to be captured alive. With all avenues of escape cut off, he turned and faced the precipice, and with the bridle in his left hand and his rifle in his right, he spurred his horse over the edge to an almost certain death. The hill at that location is about 300 feet in height, and in many places is almost perpendicular.

The Indians rushed to the edge, expecting to see the major lying dead in a crumpled heap at the bottom of the hill. To their great surprise, they instead saw McColloch, still mounted on his white horse, galloping away from them.

As legend of this famous "leap" became known, the place where it occurred became known as McColloch's Leap.

References

External links
http://lotsofsites.com/gen/mcol_leap.shtml Major Samuel McColloch's Famous Leap

1777 in the United States
Virginia in the American Revolution